Boss Hoss may refer to:

 Boss Hoss Cycles, a motorcycle company
 Hot Wheels "Boss Hoss", a 1969 Ford Mustang Boss 302 miniature
 The BossHoss, a German band

See also
 Horse